The Herbert and Elizabeth Malarkey House is a house located in southwest Portland, Oregon, listed on the National Register of Historic Places.

See also
 National Register of Historic Places listings in Southwest Portland, Oregon

References

1934 establishments in Oregon
Colonial Revival architecture in Oregon
Houses completed in 1934
Houses on the National Register of Historic Places in Portland, Oregon
Southwest Hills, Portland, Oregon